Mullingar Town Park is a public park situated in the centre of Mullingar, a town in County Westmeath, Ireland. Originally opened in the 1960s, the park includes several playgrounds, a swimming pool and a large pond near the centre.

In July 2016, the park became one of 22 public spaces in Ireland to be awarded a Green Flag. Also in 2016, it was announced that there would be high-speed WiFi available throughout the park.

References

Parks in Ireland
Protected areas of County Westmeath
Mullingar